The Davis Lake volcanic field, is a volcanic field with a group of andesitic cinder cones, lava flows and basaltic andesite shield volcano. The field is located east of the Cascade Range of Oregon, United States.

Notable vents

See also
List of volcanoes in the United States of America
Cascade Volcanoes
Davis Lake

References

Cinder cones of the United States
Shield volcanoes of the United States
Subduction volcanoes
Cascade Volcanoes
Volcanic fields of Oregon
Landforms of Klamath County, Oregon
Landforms of Deschutes County, Oregon